Boycie Nelson is a New Zealand coach who is the assistant coach of the New Zealand Warriors Holden Cup team and former rugby league former footballer who played as a goal-kicking .

Playing career

New Zealand
Nelson grew up playing rugby league, playing for the Glenora Bears in the Auckland Rugby League competition.

Nelson was signed by the Auckland Warriors and played for their Colts side in the 1995 Lion Red Cup.

In 1996, he was involved in the Waitakere City Raiders side that lost the Lion Red Cup grand final, despite Boycie scoring three tries. He was then selected in the Lion Red Cup XIII that played against the touring Papua New Guinea team.

England
In 1997, Nelson travelled to England and joined the Widnes Vikings. Here he played alongside fellow Glenora players Ben Lythe, who would also later join the Warriors, and Brian Jellick who later became a Kiwi and played for the North Queensland Cowboys.

In 1998, Nelson returned to the Glenora Bears. He represented Auckland in the 1998 domestic season and toured Papua New Guinea with the New Zealand Māori.

Warriors
In 1999 he was signed by the Auckland Warriors and played five games in the National Rugby League. During 1999 Nelson also played for the Glenora Bears in the Auckland Rugby League competition and represented Auckland North in the National Provincial competition.

World Cup
Nelson was selected in the Aotearoa Māori squad at the 2000 Rugby League World Cup. He played two games for the Māori at the tournament and scored two tries. He also toured Australia with the New Zealand Residents in 2000.

Bartercard Cup
After ending his connections with the Warriors, Nelson returned to New Zealand Domestic competition and played for the Otahuhu Leopards in the new Bartercard Cup competition. He remained with the side until the end of the 2003 season.

France
In 2004 he played for Limoux Grizzlies in their successful Challenge Cup run, which was ended by an 80–20 loss to Wigan in round five. He scored the first and the third try for Limoux, David Cenet scored the other one. He also played the final of the French cup in 2005 with Limoux.

Back in New Zealand
Nelson later played for the Waitakere Rangers in the Bartercard Cup, and again represented the New Zealand Māori in 2006, playing in the Pacific Cup.

He later joined the police and in 2008 represented the New Zealand Police at the inaugural Police World Cup. He played for the Glenora Bears in the 2010 Fox Memorial and in 2012 was a co-coach at the club.

Coaching career
Nelson was named the assistant coach of the New Zealand Warriors Holden Cup team for the 2017 season.

References

External links
Boycie Nelson rugbyleague.co.nz

1974 births
New Zealand Warriors players
New Zealand Māori rugby league players
New Zealand Māori rugby league team players
Glenora Bears players
Otahuhu Leopards players
Waitakere rugby league team players
New Zealand rugby league players
Widnes Vikings players
Auckland rugby league team players
Limoux Grizzlies players
Rugby league centres
Glenora Bears coaches
New Zealand police officers
Living people
New Zealand Warriors coaches
New Zealand rugby league coaches